Les Misérables is a 1967 television series of 10 parts each of 25 minutes produced by BBC Television and launched on 22 October 1967.

The cast included Frank Finlay as Jean Valjean and Michael Napier Brown as the barber. The film series was produced in colour, with mono sound, though there were few colour TV sets available at the time in the UK.

Although the original master videotapes were wiped, 35mm film copies of the series survived the BBC's archival purge and it was released by Simply Media onto DVD in 2019.

Plot summary

Selected cast
 Frank Finlay as Jean Valjean
 Anthony Bate as Insp. Javert
 Alan Rowe as Thenardier
 Lesley Roach as young Cosette 
 Judy Parfitt as Mme. Thenardier
 Elizabeth Counsell as Eponine
 Cavan Kendall as Enjolras
 Vivian MacKerrell as  Marius
 Michele Dotrice as Fantine and Cosette
 Derek Lamden as Gavroche
 Eileen Moore as  Mme. Victurnien
 Frederick Treves as Yves
 Finlay Currie as Bishop of Digne
 Norman Mitchell as Prefect
 Michael Robbins as Gribier
 Clifford Rose as Champmathieu

References

External links
 

1967 British television series debuts
1967 British television series endings
Films based on Les Misérables
1960s British drama television series